The 1995–96 Pilkington Cup was the 25th edition of England's premier rugby union club competition. Bath won the competition defeating Leicester in the final. The attendance of 75,000 was a world record for a rugby union match. The final ended in controversy after the referee Steve Lander awarded a penalty try in the last minute of the match which sealed victory for Bath. The event was sponsored by Pilkington and the final was held at Twickenham Stadium.

Draw and results

First round (Sep 9)

Second round (Oct 7)

Third round (Nov 4)

Fourth round (Dec 23)

Fifth round (Jan 27 & Feb 10)

Quarter-finals (Feb 24)

Semi-finals (Mar 23)

Final

References

1995-96 
1995–96 rugby union tournaments for clubs
1995–96 in English rugby union